Arantxa Rus and Tamara Zidanšek were the defending champions, but chose not to participate.

Natela Dzalamidze and Kamilla Rakhimova won the title, defeating Wang Xinyu and Zheng Saisai in the final, 6–4, 6–2.

Seeds

Draw

Draw

References

External links 
 Main draw

Upper Austria Ladies Linz - Doubles
Upper Austria Ladies Linz Doubles